Jesse Durbin Ward (February 11, 1819 – May 22, 1886) was an Ohio lawyer, politician, newspaper publisher, and American Civil War officer.

Early life and career
Ward was born in Augusta, Kentucky. His mother, Rebecca Patterson, named him in honor of the Rev. John Price Durbin (1800–1876), a noted Methodist preacher, who was a school mate of hers.

Around 1823, the family moved to Fayette County, Indiana, in the southeastern part of that state. Josiah Morrow, the historian of Warren County, wrote of Ward:
His early opportunities for education were limited, but such was his thirst for knowledge that he became an insatiable reader, and, when he was eighteen years old he had read every book he had ever seen. He has never lost his studious habits, and when at home he is most frequently found in his library . . . .

He attended for two years Miami University in Oxford, Ohio, one county east of Fayette and across the state line, then taught school in Warren County and settled there.  He studied law under Judge George J. Smith (1799–1878) and Thomas Corwin, a Lebanon attorney who later was Governor of Ohio. After he was admitted to practice, he was Corwin's law partner.

In 1845, Ward, a Whig, was elected Warren County's seventh Prosecuting Attorney, an office once held by Governor Corwin.  He served from 1846 to 1850.  From 1853 to 1854, he represented Warren County in the Fiftieth General Assembly, the first held under the new state constitution adopted in 1851. He served only one two-year term in the legislature. During that time, he sponsored legislation for the state to abandon the unprofitable Warren County Canal that connected Lebanon to the Miami and Erie Canal at Middletown.

Upon his retirement from the legislature, he opened a law office in Cincinnati, Ohio, but continued to live at Lebanon. Ward switched to the Democratic Party about this time and was its nominee for Congress in 1856 and Attorney General in 1858. (He lost the latter to Republican Christopher Wolcott.) In 1860, he supported Illinois Senator Stephen A. Douglas for President.

Civil War
When President Abraham Lincoln called for volunteers to fight in the Civil War, Ward was the first in his congressional district to enlist.  He entered the army as a private, declining a commission.  He rose to be a major in the 17th Ohio Volunteer Infantry and saw action at Mill Springs, Corinth, Stone River, Hoover's Gap, and Chickamauga. At Chickamauga, his left arm was wounded and permanently crippled. Ward was appointed colonel of the 17th Ohio Volunteer Infantry on March 1, 1864. He resigned his commission on November 8, 1864.

On January 13, 1866 President Andrew Johnson nominated Ward for appointment to the grade of brevet brigadier general, to rank from October 18, 1865, for his "gallant and meritorious conduct at the battle of Chickamauga," and the United States Senate confirmed the appointment on March 12, 1866.

Postbellum career
After the war ended, President Andrew Johnson named him United States Attorney for the Southern District of Ohio.  In 1870, he was elected a senator in the Ohio General Assembly.

At Lebanon, Ward founded The Lebanon Patriot, a Democratic paper first published on January 16, 1868.  Warren County being ardently Republican, the paper was to take the place of the previous Democratic paper in the county, the Democratic Citizen, which was destroyed by a mob at the outbreak of the Civil War.  Ward sold the paper to Edward Warwick in the 1870s.

In 1883, Ward was president of the Ohio State Bar Association.

Death

Jesse Durbin Ward died at Lebanon, Ohio on May 22, 1886. He was buried at Lebanon Cemetery, Lebanon, Ohio.

See also

List of American Civil War brevet generals (Union)

Notes

References
Dallas R. Bogan. Warren County's Involvement in the Civil War.  Franklin, Ohio:  The Author, 1991.
Eicher, John H., and David J. Eicher, Civil War High Commands. Stanford: Stanford University Press, 2001. .
Josiah Morrow. The History of Warren County, Ohio.  Chicago:  W.H. Beers, 1883.

Further reading

External links

|-

|-

1819 births
1886 deaths
19th-century American newspaper founders
19th-century American newspaper publishers (people)
Methodists from Ohio
American newspaper publishers (people)
County district attorneys in Ohio
Members of the Ohio House of Representatives
Miami University alumni
Ohio lawyers
Ohio state senators
Ohio Whigs
19th-century American politicians
People from Augusta, Kentucky
Politicians from Cincinnati
People from Lebanon, Ohio
People of Ohio in the American Civil War
Union Army generals
United States Attorneys for the Southern District of Ohio
19th-century American journalists
American male journalists
19th-century American male writers
Journalists from Ohio
Southern Methodists